The Lecuona Cuban Boys was a popular Cuban orchestra which toured the world for over forty years.

The band was founded by Ernesto Lecuona, whose role was that of a patron-entrepreneur. He did not actually play with the band, but sometimes gave a piano recital before the band played. The core of the band was put together in 1931 as Orquesta Encanto; the band changed name early in 1934. On tour in Europe, in 1934, Lecuona returned to Cuba, and Armando Oréfiche took charge of the band in Europe. Ernesto gave them the gift of his name, which, at the time, was a property well worth having, and the right to use a number of his compositions.

The LCB was exceptionally strong in arrangements, compositions and instrumental quality (most of them could play two or three instruments). Their only weak spot was the lack of a really first-rate Cuban singer, but that was not so important as might seem because they played so often to non-Latin audiences. Some of their pick-up singers could sing in English, and many of their numbers were instrumentals. The band played the full range of Cuban popular music, but their speciality was the conga. Though it was perhaps Eliseo Grenet who first composed a conga in its ballroom dance style, it was certainly the LCB who took it round the world and made it famous. The LCB was therefore the first conjunto to use the conga drum regularly in its performances, and not Arsenio Rodríguez, as is often supposed.

The band initially organized itself as a collective, but in practice Armando Oréfiche (composer, arranger, pianist) was the leader. Other band members were Ernesto 'Jaruco' Vázquez (trumpeter, guitarist, composer, arranger); Adalberto 'Chiquito' Oréfiche (tenor sax and bongo); Agustin Bruguera (timbales, conga, voice); Gerardo Bruguera (tenor sax and clarinet); Jesús Bertomeu (trombone); Jorge Domínguez (alto sax, clarinet, violin); Daniel González (alto sax, clarinet, violin); Guillermo Hernández (guitar, tumba, guiro, maracas); Enrique López Rivero (trumpet) 1932-34; Alberto Rabagliati (voice) engaged 1934; later Fernando Díaz and Luis Escalante were engaged as replacement trumpeters. In 1947 Bob (Irv) Mesher joined the group after a brief stint with Tito Puente, Tito Rodriguez and Pupi Campo.  Irv took over the lead chair when Jaruco Vazquez left the band...

The band toured throughout the world: the USA, Latin America and Europe were the main tours. When World War II broke out, the band went to Latin America and continued their touring there. After World War II there was a dispute within the band, which ended in a split. Armando Oréfiche left with a few members, and started the Havana Cuban Boys; the rest stayed under the old name, based in New York until 1960. The Lecuona Cuban Boys continued to tour, and finally retired in 1975.

References

Movies 
Aimée & Jaguar (German)
Thrills of Music

Appearances 
"Rhumba Azul" was played at the funeral (1st Oct 1942) of German WWII fighter ace (158 victories) Hans-Joachim Marseille (aged 22). Marseille "played [it] over and over until the close of day".

Weblinks 
Frank Wittendorfer: Discography of the Lecuona Cuban Boys as of Armando Oréfiche's Havana Cuban Boys on 78rpm Records 1932 to 1953

Musical groups established in 1934
Cuban musical groups
Rhumba musical groups
1934 establishments in Cuba